Summerville Historic District may refer to:

Brownville-Summerville Historic District, Phenix City, AL, listed on the National Register of Historic Places (NRHP) in Alabama
Summerville (Augusta, Georgia), listed on the NRHP as Summerville Historic District
Summerville Historic District (Summerville, South Carolina), listed on the National Register of Historic Places in Dorchester County, South Carolina